Statistics of Allsvenskan in season 1987.

Overview
Allsvenskan 1987 was played between 12 April and 4 October 1987 and was won by Malmö FF. The championship play-off finals were played from 10 to 31 October 1987 and was won by IFK Göteborg, who defeated Malmö FF in the final and thus became Swedish champions.

League table

Results

Allsvenskan play-offs 
The 1987 Allsvenskan play-offs was the sixth edition of the competition. The four best placed teams from Allsvenskan  qualified to the competition. IFK Göteborg who finished third in the league won the competition and the Swedish championship after defeating Allsvenskan champions Malmö FF.

Semi-finals

First leg

Second leg

Final

Season statistics

Top scorers

Footnotes

References 

Allsvenskan seasons
Swed
Swed
1